The 1903–04 Football League season was Aston Villa's 16th season in the First Division, the top flight of English football at the time. The season fell in what was to be called Villa's golden era.  In locally organised competition, Villa beat  Small Heath in the first round of the Birmingham Senior Cup.

Freddie Miles made his Villa debut in a 7–3 win at Nottingham Forest on 19 December 1903. During his first season at Villa he developed a good understanding with Howard Spencer.

During the season Howard Spencer was captain of the club. Arthur Lockett, such a key figure in the Stoke side the previous season, signed for Villa. Jack Windmill signed from Halesowen Town making his debut on 7 November 1903 in a 3–1 home win against Newcastle United. Bert Hall scored six goals in his nine league outings in the 1903–04 season. He was noted as being a hard working outside left player who teamed up well with Joe Bache.

Football League

First team squad

  Billy Brawn, 34 appearances
  Alf Wood, 31 appearances
  Alex Leake, 30 appearances
  Joe Bache, 29 appearances
  Arthur Lockett, 27 appearances 
  Billy George, 27 appearances, conceded 41
  Howard Spencer, 25 appearances
  Joe Pearson, 25 appearances
  Albert Wilkes, 20 appearances
  Billy Garraty, 18 appearances
  Tommy Niblo, 18 appearances
  Albert Evans, 15 appearances
  Jasper McLuckie, 15 appearances
  George Johnson, 13 appearances
  Micky Noon, 12 appearances
 Harry Cooch, 9 appearances, conceded 10
  Willie Clarke, 2 appearances
  George Harris, 2 appearances
  Jack Shutt, 1 appearance
   Jack Windmill, 1 appearance
  Freddie Miles, 17 appearances
  Albert Hall, 11 appearances
  Mart Watkins, 5 appearances
  Billy Matthews, 8 appearances

References

Aston Villa F.C. seasons
Aston Villa